"Dick" is a song by American rapper StarBoi3 featuring American rapper and singer Doja Cat. It was originally released on May 16, 2019 on SoundCloud, before being re-released on April 23, 2021 by RCA Records after going viral on TikTok. The song was produced by soFly and Nius and BigWhiteBeatz.

Background
The single was first released on May 16, 2019, as a SoundCloud exclusive. A sleeper hit, it began to gain popularity in March 2021, when TikToker @ali.scyn posted a video of her dancing to the song, starting a trend. Videos to the trend feature a section of the lyrics: "I'm getting ripped tonight / R.I.P. that pussy, ayyy / I'm going in tonight." Following its popularity on TikTok, the single was released through streaming services on April 23, 2021.

Composition
The song features sexually explicit lyrics, as well as references to pop culture that "add a comedic twist". The instrumental features "trap-y vibes".

Remixes
A remix pack was released on May 28, 2021, including three remixes to the song by L.Dre, DJ Jayhood, and Until Dawn. Another remix from Sickick was released on June 11, 2021. The official remix of the song features American rapper Ludacris and was released on August 20, 2021. A week later, a remix featuring both Doja Cat and Ludacris was released.

Charts

Certifications

References

2019 singles
2019 songs
Doja Cat songs
RCA Records singles
Song recordings produced by SoFly and Nius
Songs written by Doja Cat
Dirty rap songs
Trap music songs
Viral videos